Andrew Shanle (born March 9, 1983) is the current Head Football Coach and Athletic Director for Cypress Ridge High School, a 6A program in Houston, Texas. He's also a former American football Cornerback and Safety. He was originally signed by the Chicago Bears as an undrafted free agent in 2007. He played 8 man high school football at St. Edward High School (Nebraska) and attended the University of Nebraska on full scholarship.

He is the young brother of NFL linebacker Scott Shanle.

Shanle was signed to the New York Giants practice squad on December 4, 2007. He remained on the team during their historic super bowl win.
He did not return to an NFL roster after the 2007 season.

Coaching career 
Shanle moved to Texas in 2008 for an assistant coaching position at 4A Brenham High School.  After two years and an appearance in the 2009 Texas High School State Finals (vs. Aledo), he assisted in the opening of Cedar Creek High School in 2010. Prior to the 2011 season, he accepted the defensive coordinator position at (6A Texas) Cypress Ranch High School.  In 2012, Shanle returned to Nebraska to serve as the Director of Cross Country and Track & Field coach at Midland University in Fremont, Nebraska.  After one year, he returned to Texas to once again serve as Defensive Coordinator at 6A Cypress Ranch High School.  In 2014, the Mustangs of Cypress Ranch finished the season 13-3 with a loss to Allen HS in his second Texas High School State Finals appearance.

External links
Nebraska Cornhuskers bio
New York Giants bio

1983 births
Living people
People from Norfolk, Nebraska
American football safeties
Nebraska Cornhuskers football players
Chicago Bears players
New York Giants players